William Debenham was one of the two MPs for Ipswich in a number of English parliaments from November 1414 to 1437.

References

Members of the Parliament of England (pre-1707) for Ipswich